Unwanted  is the third studio album by English rock band Pale Waves. It was released on 12August 2022 by the independent record label Dirty Hit. The record was produced by Zakk Cervini and recorded in Los Angeles. Production for the record began roughly half a year after Pale Waves released their second album, Who Am I? (2021), with the quick turnaround due in large part to the COVID-19 pandemic, which prevented the band from touring. Indebted to the pop-punk genre, Unwanted was intended to be heavier and more aggressive than the band's previous work.

Heather Baron-Gracie (the band's lead singer and rhythm guitarist) co-wrote all of the album's songs with a close group of musical collaborators, including drummer Doran, Kelsi Luck, Cervini, Sam de Jong, Whakaio Taahi, Andrew Goldstein, and Drew Fulk. Many of the lyrics on Unwanted discuss darker topics, including anger, jealousy, substance use, depression, and suicide. Musically, the record was inspired by a variety of bands, including Paramore, My Chemical Romance, Green Day, Liz Phair, and Courtney Love; many critics have also compared the album to the work of Avril Lavigne.

According to review aggregators Metacritic and AnyDecentMusic?, Unwanted received mostly positive reviews from critics, with many applauding the band's continuing evolution, the record's heavier sound, and Cervini's pop-punk production. Some critics, however, felt that the album was too prosaic and derivative. Unwanted debuted at number four on the UK Albums Chart and at number one on the UK Independent Albums Chart. To support the album, music videos for the songs "Lies", "Reasons to Live", "Jealousy", "Clean", and "Unwanted" were released.

Production

Background

In 2018, Pale Waves released their debut album, My Mind Makes Noises; heavily influenced by the music of the 1980s, the record received mostly positive attention. Three years later, in 2021, the band released their second album, Who Am I? This record moved away from the 80s-inspired sound of the band's debut, instead taking inspiration from the alternative rock and pop rock of the 1990s and 2000. The album's lyrics focused mostly on lead singer Heather Baron-Gracie's romantic life and her LGBTQ+ identity. Because Who Am I? was released in the midst of the COVID-19 pandemic, Pale Waves had to postpone a tour in support of the album until 2022.

Inspiration and writing 
Pale Waves began working on the songs from Unwanted shortly after the release of Who Am I? – a quick turnaround which Baron-Gracie attributed to the COVID-19 pandemic having "deprived [them] from playing live music". In an interview with Zane Lowe's Apple Music 1 show, Baron-Gracie further explained that the group wanted Unwanted to be a fun, high-energy record to perform live. Pale Waves thus decided to embrace a "heavier" pop-punk sound by  "turn[ing] up the guitars" and getting "rid of the synths"; Baron-Gracie touched upon this topic again in an interview with University College Dublin's student newspaper, The University Observer, when she said that the album "hits harder" than their previous work and better emphasizes "the pop-punk element[s]" of Pale Waves.

When talking to MTV News writer Carson Mlnarik, Baron-Gracie also noted that, tonally, Unwanted is darker than previous Pale Waves's releases: "I feel like overall this album in particular touches upon subjects that we’ve never touched upon before, like loss, vanity, anger, jealousy, hopelessness ... It’s very dark. It’s very personal." In a write-up released by Rock Sound, the band cited Liz Phair and Courtney Love as inspiring some of the album's "angst and anger"; because of these emotions, Baron-Gracie felt that the record is "very raw" and "definitely way more real". The general sound of Unwanted was inspired heavily by American rock band Paramore, with Baron-Gracie telling Lowe: "Everyone knows that Pale Waves love Paramore, and I feel like we really sort of channeled them making this record."

The songs on Unwanted were written by Baron-Gracie and a "close group of collaborators in Los Angeles". This group included Ciara Doran (the band's drummer), Kelsi Luck (Baron-Gracie's partner), Zakk Cervini (the album's producer), Sam de Jong, Whakaio Taahi, Andrew Goldstein, and Drew Fulk. De Jong had previously worked with Baron-Gracie during the production of Pale Waves's second album, Who Am I?, and Goldstein had co-written the All Time Low single "PMA", which featured Pale Waves. The overall songwriting process was "intimate", and Baron-Gracie told MTV that it was "the first time where [she] felt relaxed, in a state of not panicking or a state of not second-guessing everything".

Recording

In September 2021, Heather Baron-Gracie shared a photo on herself and Ciara Doran via Instagram that revealed the band was working on a follow up to Who Am I? For this record, the band worked with Zakk Cervini, who had previously produced albums by bands like All Time Low, Poppy, Waterparks, and Yungblud. Baron-Gracie and Cervini met when she recorded guest vocals on the All Time Low single "PMA", which Cervini produced. "I laid down the vocals," Baron-Gracie explained in an interview with Upset magazine, "and instantly I knew that [Cervini] was the guy who needed to do our third record. Ciara and the band then came in and met him." When speaking to Alternative Press, Baron-Gracie further explained:

Zakk was the perfect match for us. The first time that I met him, I knew that he needed to produce our next record. He’s just a breath of fresh air, is so positive, talented and just the most genuinely nice guy ever. ... With Zakk, [recording] was just so natural. We all knew what kind of record we wanted to make with Pale Waves and were on the same wavelength. There were no clashes, and it was just so easy. Zakk really helped us create a solid piece of work that we are so happy about and wouldn’t have been the same without him.

Thanks to the band-producer dynamic and the atmosphere in the studio, working on Unwanted was "the first time ... [Baron-Gracie] actually enjoyed recording", telling Alternative Press, "All of my other previous times, I was so stressed out or having a freak out every minute". On December 4, 2021, Baron-Gracie announced on Instagram that recording for the record had concluded.

Content 

"Lies" opens the album and was released as its first single. An "angst-fueled, rebellious pop-punk anthem" inspired by the "crunchy guitars and rhythmic drive of 2000s" and "90s rock", the track was written as a way to "eas[e] fans into" the new sound of the record. Lyrically, the song is "about someone who built up [Baron-Gracie's] trust and destroyed it like a wrecking ball." As the musician explained to NME: "[The situation] caused some real trust issues, but fortunately for me that person is no longer in my life." The album's title track, "Unwanted", was inspired by Baron-Gracie's frustration with sexist double standards, specifically when it comes to expressions of anger: "If a man's angry, they're seen as ... know[ing] what they want. Whereas when a woman's angry, she's a crazy bitch. I wanted to show other women that it’s OK to feel these things." In a breakdown of the album's track listing with Apple Music, Baron-Gracie further argued that the song epitomizes the album's "dark[er], traumatic themes" and the "feelings of neglect, anger, vanity, jealousy, sadness, [and] depression" on which it is predicated. "The Hard Way" – a track that begins as an "intimate, lullaby-like acoustic" work that "builds toward soaring electric guitars" – was inspired by the music of My Chemical Romance and Green Day. Lyrically, the song discusses a girl Baron-Gracie went to high school with who was a victim of bullying and who died by suicide. "The Hard Way" expresses Baron-Gracie's regret that she did not try to help her classmate: "I got on the bus with her every single morning and I would see her sitting in her same spot. ... 'The Hard Way' is about my regret for not helping her, or standing up for her, that I feel now as an adult."

"Jealousy" is a "'90s inspired alt rock track" that has been compared to the work of Alanis Morrissette, Avril Lavigne, and The Subways. Sung from the perspective of a possessive lover who is cognizant of her behavior, the track was inspired by Baron-Gracie's personal feelings on the titular emotion: "I love a bit of jealousy  not too much, but just enough… I want jealousy in a relationship because it shows me the person only has eyes for me and me only." "Alone" is, according to Baron-Gracie, "the ultimate rejection song": "It's about when you say no to someone and they just don't leave you alone." The lyrics to the song were inspired by the many times someone had hit on Baron-Gracie and either failed or refused to notice her visible disinterest. Baron-Gracie has described "Clean" as a "cheesy love song" that was written to encapsulate the exhilaration of falling in love. Despite Unwanted being an angry record overall, the band included "Clean" so that there would be "a moment or two [of] positivity" on the album. "Without You" is the record's "huge ballad", and it was written to "be dynamic and flow through the emotions" in a way that matched the energetic feel of other tracks on the album. According to Baron-Gracie: "[The song] is about me losing someone so close to my heart that I struggle to comprehend how I can live life without them." "Only Problem"  a track that NME compared to the work of Paramore  was inspired by Baron-Gracie's former reliance on alcohol to feel confident and secure: "People in [the music] industry normalize it", she told Apple Music, "and it shouldn't be normalized. It can be abused, and I wanted to learn to live a life without it. So I removed it completely, and now I'm much happier."

"You're So Vain" was inspired by Baron-Gracie's experience with "egotistical people in the music industry": "I channeled my anger towards people's egos with ['You're So Vain']", she told Apple Music. "I wanted to take them down a step." Musically, the song has been compared to the music of Avril Lavigne, while Baron-Gracie has argued that the track is "almost more classic rock and roll in a way" due to its aggressive energy. "Reasons to Live"  "an optimistic and romantic track" thematically similar to the band's previous 2021 single "Easy"  has been described as a "euphoric burst of electric energy about finding someone who leads you out of darkness". According to Baron-Gracie: "[The song] is about a time when I felt truly drained and incapable of happiness [but] then I found someone who showed me a reason to live." "Numb" is a "stripped back" number that focuses on Baron-Gracie's struggles with depression, with the singer-songwriter telling Apple Music: "I know that a lot of people feel this way and ... and I feel it's important ... to know that other people go through it too." "Act My Age" discusses the difficulties inherent in growing older and feeling the urge to "act one's age"; per Baron-Gracie: "It’s that realization that everyone gets older and everyone needs to get their shit together." The album's closer, "So Sick (Of Missing You)", was inspired by the Netflix series Sex Education, in particular the relationship between main characters Maeve and Otis. Baron-Gracie related to elements of their relationship and decided to use the two as inspiration for this song.

Promotion

A video for the track, directed by the visual artist Vasilisa Forbes, was also released at this time, alongside an announcement about the album itself. The video sees the band performing the song on a glowing cube in an otherwise darkened room. According to Forbes, the "shadows and mysterious lighting-tonality" visually symbolize the concept of "lying" (i.e., "covering up, hiding, sinister details [and] thoughts taking place in the shadows"). A video for "Reasons to Live" (directed by Kelsi Luck and filmed in Las Vegas) was released on 25July, 2022; it features Baron-Gracie singing the song in the back of a limousine while her band mates happily party alongside her.

A music video for the song, directed by Vasilisa Forbes, was released the same day that the record made its radio debut. In the video (which is filmed in black and white), the band performs the song against a minimalist background. Baron-Gracie is also shown singing from behind a chain-link fence, and while hanging from a chain swing. The album's fourth single, "The Hard Way", was released on 20July 2022 through streaming services. On 12August  the date of the album's release  a video for "Clean", directed by Forbes, was released. A video for "Unwanted" (filmed during the band's stint opening for 5 Seconds of Summer during the summer of 2022) was released on October 25, 2022.

Pale Waves hosted an album release show at the Pryzm Kingston nightclub on 11August 2022, and the band performed a series of in-house acoustic performances at select record stores in the weeks thereafter. In September, Pale Waves began a North America tour, but on 20 September, they were forced to cancel their remaining US shows due to safety issues with their tour bus. In November, the band performed a series of shows in Japan and the United Kingdom.

Reception

Unwanted was met with mostly positive reviews from critics. At Metacritic, which assigns a weighted average rating out of 100 to reviews from mainstream publications, this release has an average score of 72 based on 7 reviews, meaning that it has received "generally favorable reviews". Fellow music aggregator AnyDecentMusic? likewise gave the album an average score of 7.2/10.

Calling the record "bold and unapologetic," Elly Watson of DIY magazine felt that Unwanted was a "defiant expression of darker emotions". Watson gave the album a four-out-of-five stars and concluded that it comprised "pop-punk anthem[s] your ‘00s faves wish they could’ve written". In a four-out-of-five star review for Dork magazine, Martyn Young wrote that "Unwanted is the ultimate realisation of their journey from eighties-indebted indie-pop to full-on pop-punk giants" and that it was "poised to take Pale Waves to new stratospheric levels". Young appreciated that the album built off the aesthetic of their previous record, Who Am I?, all the while being "bigger and heavier" than its predecessor. In a four-out-of-five star review for The Times, Lisa Verrico, too, compared the album to Who Am I?, feeling that Unwanted was more consistent; like Young, Verrico also noted the release's "genuine heaviness", which she attributed to Zakk Cervini's production work. James Hickie of Kerang magazine contend that "the music [on Unwanted] is a spry sugar rush of squeaky clean riffs and melodies that are easy to love but hard to forget." Arguing that the record represented "the most rocking Pale Waves have sounded", Hickie wrote that Unwanted "takes all of the characteristics of the band’s sound and ratchets them up another grandstanding level". He ultimately gave the record four out of five stars.

Andy Price of NME called the sound of Unwanted "an evolution few could have predicted on the evidence of Pale Waves’ synth-heavy 2018 debut", but he nevertheless applauded the record for being "fierce" and for "brashly plunging deep into the pop-punk grab-bag". He ultimately gave the record four out of five stars, concluding that the album "rais[es] the shipwreck of pop-punk from yesteryear and re-[fits] it as the flagship for those who feel genuinely maligned". Edwin McFee of Hot Press gave the record an eight out of ten. Calling Unwanted "honest and provocative", McFee positively compared it to the work of Paramore, Avril Lavigne, and Hole. Gigwise reviewer Lana Williams, in an eight-out-of-ten star review, wrote that Unwanted "flirt[s] with romanticism and vulnerability" and "encompasses the best of what Pale Waves have to offer: an in-your-face, unapologetic exploration of emotions and the human psyche." Williams positively compared several of the tracks to the music of Halsey, The Pretty Reckless, and Avril Lavigne, while also noting that album's overall "poetic lyricism and clever songwriting highlight heartache wrapped in the package of crunchy ‘90s rock and dynamic soundscapes." Dylan Tuck called the record a "catalogue of anthemic pop-punk singalongs" in a four-out-of-five star review for The Skinny. "Swimming through sincere subjects", Tuck wrote, "Baron-Gracie displays growth as a lyricist and sticks a middle finger up to the doubters." Tuck also complimented the album's pop punk sound and Zakk Cervini's production.

Other reviews were less complimentary. Danny Cooper of Pitchfork gave the album a 6.1/10. While calling the record a collection of "precise, catchy, well-executed pop-punk earworms", Cooper argued that "the band’s Achilles' heel is Baron-Gracie’s generic songwriting", which he felt was often cliché, unaffecting, and mired in "shallow melodrama". Marie Oleinik of The Line of Best Fit wrote that, with Unwanted, Pale Waves either "are comfortable exactly where they are, or maybe they want to play it safe and stick with what works". Oleinik also felt that the record's sound was too derivative of the large pop-punk scene, concluding: "There has to be more substance to make it last. After all, what's the point of an album that plays like a Warped Tour compilation when we can just listen to a Warped Tour compilation?" Tony Clayton-Lea of The Irish Times gave the album three out of five stars, writing: "Manchester's Pale Waves may not have an original idea in their bag of indie-pop/rock tricks, but that doesn't mean to say they can’t shake it up like the best of their influences (think My Chemical Romance, Avril Lavigne, Green Day, Paramore, Hole)." Despite feeling that much of the album was "generic", Clayton-Lea argued that Baron-Grace "gives [the record] an extra push", thanks to the "convincing ... way" she delivers the songs. Andrew Perry of The Telegraph gave Unwanted three out of five stars and described it as a record "along the lines of one of Courtney Love’s air-brushed, songwriter-assisted solo outings, with all guns blazing for radio-friendliness".

Accolades

Commercial performance
Unwanted was released on 12 August 2022 by the independent record label Dirty Hit on vinyl, CD, cassette, and as a digital download. In addition to the standard CD releases, Dirty Hit also released four alternate cover variants (each showcasing a different member of the band), and Blood Records released a "holographic" vinyl variant limited to 1000 hand-number copies. An extended version of the album  entitled the "Antidote Edition  was released exclusively through Apple Music. This release includes four bonus tracks: live versions of "Jealousy", "Reasons to Live", and "So Sick (Of Missing You)", as well as a live cover of the Wheatus single "Teenage Dirtbag". Additionally, the Japanese release of the album came bundled with the bonus track "I Hope that You're Happy Now".

Upon its release, Unwanted debuted at number 4 on the UK Albums Chart (Official Charts Company), selling 6,985 copies. On the UK Independent Albums Chart (OOC), it debuted at number 1, and on the Official Vinyl Albums, Official Physical Albums, and Official Record Store Charts (OOC), the record debuted at number 2. On the Scottish Albums Chart, Unwanted peaked at number 2, and in Japan, it reached 166 on the Oricon Albums Chart.

Track listing

Bonus tracks

Personnel
Credits adapted from the liner notes of Unwanted.

Pale Waves
 Heather Baron-Gracie – vocals, guitar
 Ciara Doran – drums
The other two members of the band, Hugo Silvani (guitar) and Charlie Wood (bass), are not credited in the liner notes as having performed on the album.

Additional musicians
 Zakk Cervini - guitar, bass guitar, drums, programming
 Andrew Goldstein – guitar (tracks 2, 5, 7, 8 and 13), keyboard (tracks 7 and 8), strings (track 7)
 Drew Fulk – guitar (tracks 6 and 9)

Technical
 Zakk Cervini – production
 Nik Trekov – additional production, engineering and editing
 Michael Bono – additional production and editing

Charts

Release history

Footnotes

References

2022 albums
Dirty Hit albums
Pale Waves albums